Saint-Pierre-de-Lamy is a municipality in the Canadian province of Quebec, located in Témiscouata Regional County Municipality. The municipality had a population of 112 in the Canada 2011 Census.

See also
 List of municipalities in Quebec

References

External links

Municipalities in Quebec
Incorporated places in Bas-Saint-Laurent